Torrens Creek is a rural town and locality in the Shire of Flinders, Queensland, Australia. In the  the locality of Torrens Creek had a population of 70 people.

Geography 

The Great Northern Railway enters the locality from the east (Pentland), passes through the town which is served by Torrens Creek railway station, and exits to the west (Prairie).

The creek of the same name arises in the Great Dividing Range, flowing southward to the Thomson River system to eventually run into Lake Eyre.

White Mountains National Park is in the far north and north-east of the locality. Moorrinya National Park is on the western boundary of the locality.

Apart from the protected areas, the predominant land use is grazing on native vegetation.

History 
The creek after which the town is named was named after Sir Robert Richard Torrens by the explorer William Landsborough, who discovered it in 1862 while searching for Burke and Wills. Torrens introduced Torrens title to the then colony of South Australia by means of the Real Property Act 1858; it soon spread to the other colonies and to other countries and is still in use today. Circa 1885 it was known as Boorooman.

The Great Northern Railway reached Torrens Creek in 1885, at which time it became the supply centre for a large district. Mailmen rode out far and wide to various stations, delivering mail along routes which are still used today. There is a cairn and plaque erected by Torrens Creek residents to honour the district's most famous mailman, Jack Blunt, who served from 1931 to 1954.

Torrens Creek Provisional School opened on 19 February 1891 On 1 January 1909 it became Torrens Creek State School. It closed on 6 December 1991. The school was 2 Bedford Street.

In 1942 a large World War II ammunition dump, associated with the Battle of the Coral Sea, exploded when a fire lit by American and Australian soldiers to create a firebreak got out of control.

In the  the locality of Torrens Creek had a population of 70 people.

Economy 
There are a number of homesteads in the locality, including:

 Aberfoyle
 Bannockburn
 Bells Outstation
 Cheltenham
 Cranford
 Elba
 Keen Gea
 Melinga
 Mundoo Bluff
 Oakley
 Prairie Vale
 Shirley
 Tarella
 Timaru
 Tiree
 Tumutvale
 Wattlevale
 Wogadoona
 Woura Park

Education 
There are no schools in Torrens Creek. The nearest primary schools are Prairie State School in neighbouring Prairie to the west and Pentland State School in neighbouring Pentland to the east. The nearest secondary school is Hughenden State School (to Year 12) in Hughenden to the west. However, due to the large size of the locality, the distances to these schools may be too large for daily school attendance. Distance education and boarding school are other options.

Amentities 
The town has a hotel (pub) and a garage.

Torrens Creek Golf Club has an 18-hole golf course at the northern end of Hill Street. It is open to members and visitors.

Attractions 
Sawpit Gorge Lookout is within White Mountains National Park.

Transport

References

External links

 

Towns in Queensland
Queensland in World War II
Shire of Flinders (Queensland)
Localities in Queensland
Torrens family